The Claiborne County School District is a public school district based in Port Gibson, Mississippi (USA). The district's boundaries parallel that of Claiborne County. They include the employee residences of Alcorn State University.

Schools
Port Gibson High School
Port Gibson Middle School
A. W. Watson Jr. Elementary School

Demographics

2006-07 school year
There were a total of 1,899 students enrolled in the Claiborne County School District during the 2006–2007 school year. The gender makeup of the district was 50% female and 50% male. The racial makeup of the district was 99.53% African American and 0.47% White. 99.9% of the district's students were eligible to receive free lunch.

Previous school years

Accountability statistics

See also

List of school districts in Mississippi
Chamberlain-Hunt Academy - Private school in Port Gibson

References

External links
 
 Claiborne County School District (Archive)

Education in Claiborne County, Mississippi
School districts in Mississippi